Bahawalpur is a city in the Punjab province of Pakistan. With  inhabitants as of 2017, it is Pakistan's 11th most populous city.

Founded in 1748, Bahawalpur was the capital of the former princely state of Bahawalpur, ruled by the Abbasi family of Nawabs until 1955. The Nawabs left a rich architectural legacy, and Bahawalpur is now known for its monuments dating from that period. The city lies at the edge of the Cholistan Desert, and serves as the gateway to the nearby Lal Suhanra National Park.

History
Bahawalpur was among the 584 princely states before the Partition of India.

Early history 

Bahawalpur State was home to various ancient societies. The Bahawalpur region was part of Multan province of Mughal Empire in recent history. It contains ruins from the Indus Valley civilisation, as well as ancient Buddhist sites such as the nearby Patan minara. British archaeologist Sir Alexander Cunningham identified the Bahawalpur region as home of the Yaudheya kingdoms of the Mahābhārata. Prior to the establishment of Bahawalpur, the region's major city was the holy city of Uch Sharif – a regional metropolitan centre between the 12th and 17th centuries that is renowned for its collection of historic shrines dedicated to Muslim mystics from the 12–15th centuries built in the region's vernacular style.

Establishment 
Bahawalpur was established in 1748 by Nawab Bahawal Khan I, after he migrated to the region around Uch from Shikarpur, Sindh. Bahawalpur replaced Derawar as the clan's capital city. The city initially flourished as a trading post on trade routes between Afghanistan and central India.

Durrani Attacks 
In 1785, the Durrani commander Sirdar Khan attacked Bahawalpur city and destroyed many of its buildings on behalf of Mian Abdul Nabi Kalhora of Sindh. Bahawalpur's ruling family, along with nobles from nearby Uch, were forced to take refuge in the Derawar Fort, where they successfully repulsed further attacks. The attacking Durrani force accepted 60,000 rupees as nazrana or tribute, though Bahawal Khan later had to seek refuge in the Rajput states as the Afghan Durranis occupied Derawar Fort. Bahawal Khan returned to conquer the fort by way of Uch, and re-established control of Bahawalpur.

Princely state 

The princely state of Bahawalpur was founded in 1802 by Nawab Mohammad Bahawal Khan II after the break-up of the Durrani Empire, and was based in the city.

Sikh Attacks and treaties with the British 
In 1807, Ranjit Singh of the Sikh Empire laid siege to the fort in Multan, prompting refugees to seek safety in Bahawalpur in the wake of his marauding forces that began to attack the countryside around Multan. Ranjit Singh eventually withdrew the siege, and gave the Nawab of Bahawalpur some gifts as the Sikh forces retreated.

Bahalwapur offered an outpost of stability in the wake of crumbling Mughal rule and the declining power of Khorasan's monarchy. The city became a refuge for prominent families from affected regions and also saw an influx of religious scholars escaping the consolidation of Sikh power in Punjab.

Fearing an invasion from the Sikh Empire, Nawab Mohammad Bahawal Khan III signed a treaty with the British on 22 February 1833, guaranteeing the independence of the Nawab and the autonomy of Bahawalpur as a princely state. The treaty guaranteed the British a friendly southern frontier during their invasion of the Sikh Empire.

Trade Routes 
Trade routes had shifted away from Bahawalpur by the 1830s, and British visitors to the city noted several empty shops in the city's bazaar. The population at this time was estimated to be 20,000, and was noted to be made up primarily of Hindus. Also in 1833, the Sutlej and Indus Rivers were opened to navigation, allowing goods to reach Bahawalpur. By 1845, newly opened trade routes to Delhi re-established Bahawalpur as a commercial centre. The city was known in the late 19th century as a centre for the production of silk goods, lungis, and cotton goods. The city's silk was noted to be of higher quality than silk works from Benares or Amritsar.

Increased British Influence 
An 1866 crisis over succession to the Bahawalpur throne markedly increased British influence in the princely state. Bahawalpur was constituted as a municipality in 1874. Bahalwapur's Nawab celebrated the Golden Jubillee of Queen Victoria in 1887 in a state function at the Noor Mahal palace. In 1901, the population of the city was 18,546.

The Second World War 
At the outbreak of World War II in 1939, Bahawalpur's Nawab was the first ruler of a princely state to offer his full support and resources of the state towards the crown's war efforts.

Joining Pakistan 

British Princely states were given the option to join either Pakistan or India upon British withdrawal from the Sub-Continent in August 1947. The city and the princely state of Bahawalpur acceded to Pakistan on October 7, 1947, under Nawab Sadiq Muhammad Khan Abbasi V Bahadur. Following independence, the city's minority Hindu and Sikh communities migrated to India en masse, while Muslim refugees from India settled in the city and the surrounding region.

District Statistics 
There are 6 tehsils in District Bahawalpur, with 109 union councils, 714 villages, and 5 municipal committees.

Climate 
Bahawalpur lies some 117m above sea level. The climate is dry. Over the year, there is virtually no rainfall in Bahawalpur. According to the Köppen-Geiger system, it is classified as BWh. The average annual temperature is 25.7 °C | 78.3 °F. The rainfall is around 143 mm | 5.6 inch per year.

Flora and Fauna

Flora 

 Kikar
 Shisham
 Sufaida
 Neem
 Siris
 Toot
 Sohanjana

Fauna 

 Blackbuck
 Rabbit
 Deer

Economy

The main crops for which Bahawalpur is recognised are cotton, sugarcane, wheat, sunflower seeds, rape/mustard seed and rice. Bahawalpur mangoes, citrus, dates and guavas are some of the fruits exported out of the country. Vegetables include onions, tomatoes, cauliflower, potatoes and carrots. Being an expanding industrial city, the government has revolutionised and liberalised various markets allowing the caustic soda, cotton ginning and pressing, flour mills, fruit juices, general engineering, iron and steel re-rolling mills, looms, oil mills, poultry feed, sugar, textile spinning, textile weaving, vegetable ghee and cooking oil industries to flourish. Sheep and cattle are raised for export of wool and hides.

Crafts 
Bahawalpur is famous for its carpets, embroidery, and pottery. The Punjab government has set up a Craft Development Centre from where handicrafts can be purchased. These handicrafts are mostly manufactured in the Cholistan area. Following is the list of some of the mementos manufactured in the city:

 Flassi: It is made up of camel hair and can be used as a carpet or wall hanging
 Gindi: A colourful combination of cotton cloth with delicate needlework. It can be used as a blanket, carpet, or bed cover
 Changaries: Made up of palm leaves. They can be used as a decorative wall hanging or can be used to store chapatis / wheat bread
 Khalti: A kind of purse with multi-coloured threadwork
 Artwork: Special traditional embroidery done on kurta, chaddar/shawl etc

Demographics
According to the 2017 Census of Pakistan, the city's population was recorded as having risen to 762,111 from 408,395 in 1998.

Religion

Bahawalpur emerged as a centre of Chishti Sufism following the establishment of a khanqa by Noor Muhammad Muharvi in the mid-18th century. Most residents are Muslims with a small minority being Hindus and Christians. There are about 2000 Christian families with one church, St. Dominic's Church built in 1962 by the Government of Punjab (the Dominican Convent School for girls and St. Dominican's Middle School for Boys were also built under the same project). Father Zafar Iqbal was the first Parish priest of the church until his death on February 19, 2009.

Civic administration
Bahawalpur was announced as one of six cities in Punjab whose security would be improved by the Punjab Safe Cities Authority. 5.6 billion Rupees were allocated for the project, for the city to be modeled along the lines of the Lahore Safe City project in which 8,000 CCTV cameras were installed throughout the city at a cost of 12 billion rupees to record and send images to the Integrated Command and Control Centres.

Infrastructure 

 The city's Noor Mahal palace was completed in 1875.
 In 1878, the 4,285-foot long Empress Bridge was constructed as the only rail crossing over the Sutlej River.
 Two hospitals were established in the city in 1898.
 The Bahawal Stadium or (formerly) The Bahawalpur Dring Stadium.
 The Darbar Mahal was built in 1905.

Bahawalpur Museum 
The Bahawalpur Museum, established in 1976, is a museum of archaeology, art, heritage, modern history, and religion. It comes under the control of the Bahawalpur district government. The current director of the museum is Hussain Ahmed Madni. It has eight galleries:

 Pakistan Movement gallery
 Archaeological gallery
 Islamic gallery; manuscripts, inscriptions, and Quranic documents
 Cultural heritage gallery
 Art gallery
 Coins gallery
 Cholistan gallery
 Nawab Bahawal Memorial gallery

Bahawalpur Zoo 
The Bahawalpur Zoo, established in 1942, is a 25-acre (10 ha) zoological garden. It is managed by the Government of Pakistan.

The zoo has occasionally bred and supplied wild cats, such as Asiatic lions and Bengal tigers, to other zoos in the country. It also has an aquarium and zoological museum with stuffed birds, reptiles, and mammals. The Bahawalpur Zoo is the fourth biggest zoo in Pakistan, after Lahore Zoo, Karachi Zoo and Islamabad Zoo.

Railway Station 

 Bahawalpur Railway Station is located in Bahawalpur city at the elevation of 385 ft. It is one of the major railway stations of Pakistan Railways on the Karachi-Peshawar main line.
 The station is staffed and has advance and current reservation offices.
 In 2016, the Railways Minister Khawaja Saad Rafique announced that PKR. 280 million will be spent on the construction of a Model Railway Station in Bahawalpur.
 The routes linked Bahawalpur to the cities of Karachi, Lahore, Rawalpindi, Peshawar, Quetta, Multan, Faisalabad, Sargodha, Sialkot, Gujranwala, Hyderabad, Sukkur, Jhang, Rahim Yar Khan, Nawabshah, Attock, Sibi, Khanewal, Gujrat, Rohri, Jacobabad, and Nowshera.

Lal Suhanra National Park 
Lal Suhanra is a national park in Pakistan. The park itself is situated some 35 kilometres east of Bahawalpur. It is one of South Asia's largest national parks and is a UNESCO declared Biosphere Reserve. Lal Sohanra is notable for the diversity of its landscape, which includes desert, forest, and wetland ecosystems.

Education 
Bahawalpur's Sadiq Egerton College was founded in 1886. The first university, Islamia University was founded as Jamia Abbasia in 1925. The city's Quaid-e-Azam Medical College was founded in 1971. The District has an overall literacy rate of 48% with a total of 1662 schools and 24 colleges.

Transportation 
Local transportation vehicles include buses, cars, motorbikes, and rickshaws.

N-5 
Pakistan's longest national highway, N-5, also passes through the city, connecting Bahawalpur to Karachi and Lahore.

Railroad 
The railway connects Bahawalpur with the cities of Karachi, Lahore, Rawalpindi, Peshawar, Quetta, Multan, Faisalabad, Sargodha, Sialkot, Gujranwala, Hyderabad, Sukkur, Jhang, Rahim Yar Khan, Nawabshah, Attock, Sibi, Khanewal, Gujrat, Rohri, Jacobabad, and Nowshera.

Sports
Bahawal Stadium or (formerly) The Bahawalpur Dring Stadium is a multi-purpose stadium in the city. It hosted a sole international match, a test match between Pakistan and India on the 15th and 18 January 1955. Motiullah hockey stadium is in the Bahawal Stadium and is used for various national and international hockey tournaments in the country. Aside from the cricket ground, it has a gym and a pool facility for citizens. There are also tennis courts, under the administration of the Bahawalpur Tennis Club, and a 2-kilometre jogging track around the football ground.

Notable people 

Masood Azhar, founder of Jaish-e-Mohammed, UN-designated global terrorist
 Former field hockey player, Samiullah Khan, was born in the city.
Former journalist, presenter and producer at the BBC World Service, Durdana Ansari, OBE, was born in the city.
 Pakistani footballer, Muhammad Adil.
Former Member of National Assembly Nawab Salahuddin Abbasi.
Member of the Provincial Assembly of Punjab, Samiullah Chaudhary.
Former member of the National Assembly of Pakistan and elected member of the Provincial Assembly of Punjab, Mumtaz Jajja.
Disabled Cricket Team Player, Muhammad Zubair Saleem.
Television and theater actor and writer, Saqib Sameer.
Member of National Assembly of Pakistan, Muhammad Farooq Azam Malik.

See also
 Bahawalpur Museum
 Bahawalpur Zoo
 List of educational institutions in Bahawalpur
 List of people from Bahawalpur

References

Bibliography

External links 

 
 

Populated places in Bahawalpur District
Populated places established in 1748
Bahawalpur District
Cities in Punjab (Pakistan)
Tehsils of Punjab, Pakistan